Devoy is a surname. Notable people with the surname include:

 Dawson Devoy (born 2001), Irish footballer
 John Devoy (1842–1928), Irish rebel leader and journalist
 Susan Devoy (born 1964), New Zealand squash player
 Robert Devoy, Irish geographer